= Ilorin Waka =

Ilorin Waka is a popular Islamic and Yoruba cultural music The Ilorin Waka is an Islamic and cultural oral entertainment form, usually performed at a given ceremony. During its performance, people gather to savour the melody that the solemn danceable local rendition provides. The Waka is an interplay of education, sermonisation or sensitisation and other sundry messages bothering on serious matters of life, skillfully and meaningfully woven together in unique language.
